"Luz V", also known as "V", is the fifth studio album by the Spanish rock singer-songwriter Luz Casal. It was her very first album released in 1989 under Hispavox her new label after departing from Zafiro, her former record company.

In this album, the performer started collaborating with other artists counting with the executive production of the Colombian musician Chucho Merchán, who participated in Casal's previous album as a musician back in 1987. She also met other composers such as Paco Trinidad and Pancho Varona (One of the habitual producers of Joaquín Sabina).

This album is the longest studio release of the performer with 14 tracks, much longer than her four first albums which only had nine songs.

Style 
Five maxi singles were extracted from this release. With this album, unlike the previous one, Luz returned to the rock or hard rock sound of her first three releases but improved with a more modern and more sophisticated production. It is considered that this album is the most "Rock''n Roll" one of the career of this singer with only three ballads. One of those ballads, that was released as the first Maxi single, was "Te dejé marchar" (I let you go), which was composed by David Summers, the lead member of the band Hombres G. This song is considered by many as a hymn dedicated to those ones who have lost their lovers. The second and very popular single was "Loca" (Crazy woman) a song with very sensual and provocating lyrics that had a much more powerful sound and stronger arrangements.

The third single and arguably the most popular one of this album was "No me importa nada" (I don't care at all), a song arranged with caribbean rhythms whose lyrics, written by Gloria Varona and based on a personal story of the lyricist, showed feelings of distrust and lack of confidence to a possible lover. So high was the popularity of this song that it even reached the first place in Los 40 principales top 40 chart and was translated into French. The remaining two maxi singles "El tren" (The train) and "He visto un angel" (I've seen an angel) were powerful rock tracks as the most songs in this album.

Track listing

Reception 
Luz Casal sold with this album in Spain over 400.000 copies. Due to these high selling figures it is considered that the performer entered in her golden era due to the everytime bigger exposure both inside and outside Spain. Some year later in 1998, a compilation album which featured the French version of "No me importa nada" was released in France receiving also a successful welcome.

References

External links 
 Luz V in Luz Casal official website

Luz Casal albums
1989 albums